The PFL 6 mixed martial arts event for the 2018 season of the Professional Fighters League was held on August 16, 2018, at the Ocean Resort Casino in Atlantic City, New Jersey. It was the sixth regular season event of 2018 and included only fights in the welterweight and middleweight divisions.

Background
Paul Bradley was expected to face Rick Story at this event. However, Bradley was removed due to an unspecified reason and replaced by Carlton Minus.

Results

Standings after event
The point system consists of outcome based scoring and bonuses for an early win. Under the outcome based scoring system, the winner of a fight receives 3 points and the loser receives 0 points. If the fight ends in a draw, both fighters will receive 1 point. The bonus for winning a fight in the first, second, or third round is 3 points, 2 points, and 1 point respectively. For example, if a fighter wins a fight in the first round, then the fighter will receive 6 total points. If a fighter misses weight, then the fighter that missed weight will receive 0 points and his opponent will receive 3 points due to a walkover victory.

Welterweight

Middleweight

♛ = Clinched playoff spot --- E = Eliminated

See also
List of PFL events
List of current PFL fighters

References

Professional Fighters League
2018 in mixed martial arts
Sports in Atlantic City, New Jersey
Mixed martial arts in New Jersey
2018 in sports in New Jersey
August 2018 sports events in the United States